La Foa  is a commune in the South Province of New Caledonia, an overseas territory of France in the Pacific Ocean.

Although the provincial seat of the South Province is in Nouméa, La Foa was made the chief town of the administrative subdivision of the South in order to counterbalance the overwhelming weight of Nouméa in New Caledonia. Both entities share an almost identical territory, but their status and role is quite different: the South Province, with its provincial assembly in Nouméa, is a full political division, whereas the administrative subdivision of the South is only an administrative division of the French central state, akin to an arrondissement of Metropolitan France, with a Deputy Commissioner of the Republic (commissaire délégué de la République), akin to a subprefect of metropolitan France, in residence in La Foa.

Geography

Climate

La Foa has a tropical monsoon climate (Köppen climate classification Am).

References

External links 
 Commune de La Foa - Official site

Foa